Dragon Rider, Dragonrider or DragonRider may refer to:

Film 
 Dragon Rider (film), a film based on the novel by Cornelia Funke

Literature 

 Dragon Rider (novel), a novel by Cornelia Funke
 Dragonriders of Pern, a series of novels by Anne and Todd McCaffrey
 "Dragonrider", a segment of the novel Dragonflight
 Dragonrider, a villain from Marvel Comics
 Dragon Riders, a group of fictional magician-warriors in Christopher Paolini's Inheritance Cycle

Astronautics 
 DragonRider, the former name of the SpaceX Dragon 2 spacecraft by SpaceX

See also 
 Eragon (film)